Attila Barcza (born 20 February 1985) is a Hungarian politician and teacher.

He was elected to the Hungarian Parliament in 2018.

References

1985 births
Living people
Members of the National Assembly of Hungary (2018–2022)
Members of the National Assembly of Hungary (2022–2026)
Fidesz politicians
21st-century Hungarian politicians